St. Matthew High School may refer to:

St. Matthew High School (Los Angeles, California)
St. Matthew High School (Melrose, Louisiana), listed on the NRHP in Louisiana
St. Matthew High School (Ottawa)